John Day is 2013 Hindi thriller film directed by Ahishor Solomon and produced by K Asif, Anjum Rizvi and Aatif Khan. The film features Naseeruddin Shah, Randeep Hooda, Vipin Sharma, Shernaz Patel as main characters. It is an unofficial remake of the Spanish thriller Box 507.

Plot
John Day is a bank manager of Royal Citizen Co-operative Bank and lives with his wife Maria Day. The couple has recently lost their only daughter Pearl in a forest fire while she was on a trip with her boyfriend Kanishk. Maria is always depressed and never opens up with anyone. One day when John is away for office work, a courier-boy enters the house and takes Maria as a captive. He then calls up John informing him about his wife is a hostage, and tells him that a man will visit him at his bank and John has to do his work. It is shown that actually, it was a planned bank heist where the visitor gagged John, opened up the cash locker and fled. Meanwhile, the kidnapper hammered Maria causing her a serious brain damage, and she got admitted to the hospital in a state of coma.

The news spread like wildfire in all TV channels. An impatient and short tempered Police Officer, Gautam, is shocked and calls his girlfriend Tabassum to collect a very important document stored in a locker of the bank. Inside the bank, the bank authorities, in the presence of the police, are giving away claims to bank customers, when Tabassum approaches and claims her documents which are revealed to be some property papers called "CASABLANCA ESTATES". This surprises John Day, and he follows the duo in his car and observes them depositing the file in a government property office. John bribes the office personnel and procures the original Casablanca files, and investigates.

During his investigation, he learns that police Officer Gautam also seeks the files and wants to sell them to a Mafia-based organization in Dubai. Gautam is under pressure from the Mafia to hand over the original documents of "Casablanca Estates". John vows to take revenge on the people who have injured his wife and actually eliminates all the informants, including the kidnapper, the bank robbers and others involved. He then takes Tabassum as a captive and calls Gautam, and another powerful Mafia Khan Saab at Gautam's place, and there, the truth is revealed.

Casablanca estate is nothing but 8000 acres of forest land being acquired illegally on papers by Mafia Lord Khan Saab and Dubai based Al Hunain, along with the help of Police Officer Gautam, who works for Khan. They had acquired the land, registered it with the insurance company and then set fire to the jungle in order to get heavy compensation. It was revealed that on that fateful day, when the fire erupted, John Day's daughter Pearl was there for a jungle trip and perished in the same while her boyfriend escaped unhurt.

Meanwhile, Gautam has a plan to sell the papers for billions to the Dubai-based AG group and settling with his girlfriend abroad. When Khan is about to shoot Gautam for his treachery, Tabassum opens fire to save him. An ensuing shoot out occurs in the room and results in Tabassum being killed, Khan and his associates, badly wounded and finally, Gautam being shot multiple times by John. John then shoots Khan Saab too. Later he is shown weeping at the graves of his daughter and wife. The film ends with a Biblical quote by Mark "For what will it profit a man if he gains the whole world, and loses his own soul? Mark 8:36".

Cast
Naseeruddin Shah as John Day
Randeep Hooda as Gautam, a police officer
Vipin Sharma as Inspector Mangesh Shinde
Shernaz Patel as Maria Day, wife of John Day
Sharat Saxena as Sikander Hayat Khan Saab
Elena Kazan as Tabassum Habibi, Gautam's girlfriend
Anant Mahadevan as Vinod Pandey, Editor-in-Chief, The News
Kenneth Desai as Prakash Nair
Makarand Deshpande as Krishnan
Bharat Dabholkar as Ex-Mayor Deshmukh
Denzil Smith as the Priest
Sushil Pandey as Ranade
Deepak Shirke as Wagle
Sujata Thakkar as Chitra Nair
Vikrant Ghosh as Pramod Pathak
Sikander as Moosa
K.C.Shankar as Anis Pathan
Dinesh Lamba as Liyaqat
Arika Silalchia as Pearl Day, daughter of John Day
Pavel Gulati as Kanishk
Ravi Singh as Shafiq
Akhilesh Tiwari as Pramod Pathak's land-lord
Taran Bajaj as Rajinder Singh, Ventura Bank Manager
Shanvi Sharma as baby Pearl Day
Amaan as Liyaqat's helper boy
Nazneen Madan as Doctor
Diwakar Prasad as Mambo, bookie
Asif Akhtar as hawala man
Sukhwinder Chahal as RDO Officer

Soundtrack
The soundtrack was composed by Kshitij Tarey & Strings and the lyrics are penned by Sayeed Quadri & Strings. The music was released on 26 August 2013. Songs are as follows:

References

External links
 
 

2010s Hindi-language films
Indian action thriller films
Films scored by Strings
2013 thriller films
2013 films
Hindi-language thriller films
Indian remakes of Spanish films